Stephen Farrell may refer to:

Stephen Farrell (journalist) (born 1962), Irish-British journalist
Stephen Farrell (track and field) (1863–1933), American track athlete and coach 
Stephen Farrell (footballer) (born 1973), footballer for Stoke City
Stephen Farrell (cyclist) (born 1965), British cyclist